The jiagun ( 夾棍) ankle crusher was a Chinese instrument of torture consisting of three wooden boards approximately a yard in length that were connected with cords, which when placed around a suspect's feet and gradually pulled, caused agonizing pain in order to force a confession. Under traditional Chinese law, a person could not be convicted of a crime unless they confessed. The jiagun was a legal and non-lethal method for torturing men to confess, and for women there was the similar and less painful zanzhi finger crusher with small sticks and cords.

Names
The word jiāgùn is written with two Chinese characters. The first jiā (夾) means "press from two sides; pinch; press; squeeze" and the second character gùn (棍) means "rod; stick; villain". Jiābàng (夾棒]), with bàng (棒, "stick; club; cudgel"), is a synonym of jiāgùn.

In terms of Chinese character classification, the former logograph is a compound ideograph combining three people, a 大 "big person with outstretched arms" between two smaller 人 "people", and the latter is a phono-semantic character; with the semantically-significant radical "wood" radical (木) and a phonetic element of kūn (昆 "elder brother"). Compare jiā (梜 "chopsticks") with the same "wood" radical and jiā (夾) phonetic, denoting "pick up with pincers or chopsticks".

Western accounts of Chinese torture

In the wi English translation,

Álvaro Semedo (1585–1658), the Portuguese Jesuit priest and missionary in China, wrote a classic 1642 Spanish-language  account of China that was subsequently translated into several European languages. Semedo had personal knowledge of the Chinese judicial system, he was "imprisoned for a year during the 1616 anti-Christian campaign and spent thirty days in a cage while being transported from Nanjing to Canton" (Brook 2008, 157). The front cover identifies the Portuguese historian Manuel de Faria e Sousa (1590–1649) as the publisher, but Faria e Sousa later claimed authorship (Pina 2018, 36–37).

Giovanni Battista Giattini's 1643 Italian translation of Semedo repeated the original description of the Kia quen ankle crusher and added one for the so-called Tean zu finger crusher (Semedo 1643, 181). Written and published in only one year, this text was flawed by typographical and printing errors, "some of which were quite significant" (Pina 2018, 38). Thomas Henshaw's 1655 English translation of Semedo capitalizes the second syllables as Kia Quen and Tean Zu (Semedo 1655, 143). The 1667 French translation by Louis Coulon hyphenates Kia-quen and Tean-zu (Semedo 1667, 209). The context in Henshaw's translation says:

George Ryley Scott's popular 1940 The History of Torture Throughout the Ages quotes Semedo (1655) and Staunton (1810), adding that the kia quen and tean zu were not to be used for "criminals under fifteen years of age or over seventy; to the diseased or the crippled". (Scott 1940, 103). This odd teanzu spelling exemplifies what linguists and lexicographers call a ghost word, an original typographic error that is repeatedly copied for generations.

Translations
Translating  into English is problematic owing to the lack of an equivalent word. Brodequin is an obsolete English name for a buskin or "a high boot reaching about half-way up the calves of the legs" (OED), and named a type of wooden torture boot. Chinese-dictionaries and books generally describe :
"an instrument of torture for compressing the ancles"  (Morrison 1815, 588)
"a kind of torture, like the thumb-screws" (Medhurst 1847, 148)
"a wooden instrument for the squeezing the ankles to extort evidence" (Giles 1912, 136)
"torture instruments used for squeezing in order to elicit evidence" (Mathews 1931, 82)
"formerly, an instrument of torture, a rack" (Lin 1972)
"leg-rack applied to criminals" (DeFrancis 1996)
"leg squeezer" (Theobold 2000)
"ankle press", "ankle crusher" (Brook et al 2008, 43, 172)
"leg vise (torture instrument)" (CEDICT 2022)

The near-equivalent word brodequin is an obsolete English name for a buskin or "a high boot reaching about half-way up the calves of the legs" (OED), and was recorded as a type of boot torture. The prolific author George Ryley Scott, who repeated the tean zu ghost word, describes brodequin torture, which was used in early modern Scotland and France:

This description closely resembles the Chinese  torture, except that the victim was sitting rather than lying down.

References
Brook, Timothy, Jérôme Bourgon, and Gregory Blue (2008), Death by a Thousand Cuts, Harvard University Press.
Giles, Herbert A. (1912), A Chinese-English Dictionary, revised ed., 2 vols. Kelly & Walsh.
medhurst, George Henry (1801), The punishments of China, Illustrated by Twenty-Two Engravings in English and French, illustrated by John Dadley, W. Bulmer and Co.
Medhurst, Walter Henry (1847), English and Chinese dictionary in Two Volumes, Mission Press.
de Mendoza, Juan González (1585), Historia de las cosas más notables, ritos y costumbres del gran reyno de la China, Rome.
de Mendoza, Juan González (1588), tr. Robert Parke, The History of the Great and Mighty Kingdom of China and the Situation Thereof, Vol. 1, 1853 reprint edited by George Staunton, 2 vols.
Morrison, Robert (1815), A Dictionary of the Chinese Language, in Three Parts, Vol. I East India Company's Press.
Pina, Isabel (2018), "Representations of China in Álvaro Semedo's work", in Visual and Textual Representations in Exchanges Between Europe and East Asia 16th–18th Centuries, Luis Saraiva and Catherine Jami (eds), World Scientific 2018, 31-53.
Scott, George Ryley (1940, 1959), The History of Torture Through the Ages, Kegan Paul.
Semedo, Álvaro (1642), [https://archive.org/details/imperiodelachina00seme_0/page/n208/mode/1up Imperio de la China, i cultura evangelica en èl, por los religios de la Compañia de Iesus], Iuan Sanchez (Spanish original).
Semedo, Álvaro (1643), Relatione della grande monarchia della Cina del p. Aluaro Semedo portughese della Compagnia di Giesù, Hermanni Scheus (Italian translation).
Semedo, Álvaro (1655), The history of that great and renowned monarchy of China. Wherein all the particular provinces are accurately described: as also the dispositions, manners, learning, lawes, militia, government, and religion of the people. Together with the traffick and commodities of that countrey, E. Tyler for I. Crook, (English translation).
Semedo, Álvaro (1667), Histoire vniverselle de la Chine, Chez Hierosme Prost, (French translation).
Staunton, George Thomas (1810), Ta Tsing Leu Lee - The Fundamental Laws, and a Selections from the Supplementary Statutes, of the Penal Code of China, Cadell and Davies.
Theobold, Ulrich (2000), Xingju 刑具, penal or torture instruments, Chinaknowledge.

See also
Tablilla, a medieval Spanish torture device for crushing the fingers and toes

Instruments of torture
Asian instruments of torture
Ancient instruments of torture